Pseudopythina is a genus of bivalves belonging to the family Lasaeidae.

Species
 Pseudopythina africana (Bartsch, 1915)
 Pseudopythina macandrewi (P. Fischer, 1867)
 Pseudopythina marchadi (Nicklès, 1955)
 Pseudopythina ndarensis (Rosso, 1975)
 Pseudopythina nicklesi (Rosso, 1975)
 Pseudopythina solida (Cosel, 1995)
Synonyms
 Pseudopythina ariakensis (Habe, 1959): synonym of Borniopsis ariakensis Habe, 1959
 Pseudopythina compressa (Dall, 1899): synonym of Neaeromya compressa (Dall, 1899)
 Pseudopythina macrophthalmensis B. Morton & Scott, 1989: synonym of Borniopsis macrophtalmensis (B. Morton & Scott, 1989)
 Pseudopythina maipoensis B. Morton & Scott, 1989: synonym of Borniopsis maipoensis (B. Morton & Scott, 1989)
 Pseudopythina muris Rosewater, 1984: synonym of Aligena muris (Rosewater, 1984) (original combination)
 Pseudopythina myaciformis Dall, 1916: synonym of Neaeromya rugifera (Carpenter, 1864)
 Pseudopythina nodosa B. Morton & Scott, 1989: synonym of Borniopsis nodosa (B. Morton & Scott, 1989)
 Pseudopythina ochetostomae B. Morton & Scott, 1989: synonym of Borniopsis ochetostomae (B. Morton & Scott, 1989)
 Pseudopythina rugifera (Carpenter, 1864): synonym of Neaeromya rugifera (Carpenter, 1864)
 Pseudopythina sagamiensis Habe, 1961: synonym of Borniopsis sagamiensis (Habe, 1961) (original combination)
 Pseudopythina tsurumaru (Habe, 1959): synonym of Borniopsis tsurumaru Habe, 1959

References

External links
 Gofas, S.; Le Renard, J.; Bouchet, P. (2001). Mollusca. in: Costello, M.J. et al. (eds), European Register of Marine Species: a check-list of the marine species in Europe and a bibliography of guides to their identification. Patrimoines Naturels. 50: 180-213
  Neave, Sheffield Airey. (1939-1996). Nomenclator Zoologicus vol. 1-10 Online

Lasaeidae
Bivalve genera